= Würth 400 =

Würth 400 may refer to:

- NASCAR Cup Series at Texas Motor Speedway, the title sponsor of the race from 2025-present.
- NASCAR Cup Series at Dover Motor Speedway, the title sponsor of the race from 2023-2024.
